The 2015–16 Premier League of Belize (also known as The Belikin Cup) was the fifth season of the highest competitive football league in Belize, after it was founded in 2011. There were two seasons which were spread over two years, the opening was played towards the end of 2015 and the closing was played at the beginning of 2016.

Team information

Opening season

From the 2014–15 Premier League of Belize season, 6 out of the 9 teams continued to play in the opening season of 2015–16. FC Belize, King Energy/Freedom Fighters and San Ignacio United were the absentees.

There would be one league consisting of the 6 teams, who will play each other twice, with the top 4 teams advancing to the end of season playoffs. The opening season commenced on 15 August 2015.

League table

Results

Round 1

Round 2

Round 3

Round 4

Round 5

Round 6

Round 7

Round 8

Round 9

Round 10

Playoffs

Semi-finals 

Game One

Game Two

Verdes won 3–1 on aggregate

Police United won 3–2 on aggregate

Finals 

Game One

Game Two

Police United won 1–0 on aggregate

Season Statistics

Top scorers

 Includes playoff goals.

Hat-tricks

Awards

In the post-game ceremonies of the final game of the season, the individual awards were announced.

Closing season

All 6 teams that participated in the opening season will participate in the closing season.

The format will be the same as the opening season with one league consisting of the 6 teams, who will play each other twice, with the top 4 teams advancing to the end of season playoffs. The closing season commenced on 23 January 2016.

League table

Results

Round 1

Round 2

Round 3

Round 4

Round 5

Round 6

Round 7

Round 8

Round 9

Round 10

Playoffs

Semi-finals 

Game One

Game Two

Belmopan Bandits won 3–2 on aggregate.

Series tied 5–5 on aggregate. Placencia Assassins won 8–7 on penalties.

Finals 

Game One

Game Two

Belmopan Bandits won 2–0 on aggregate.

Season statistics

Top scorers

 Includes playoff goals.

Awards

In the post-game ceremonies of the final game of the season, the individual awards were announced.

References

Top level Belizean football league seasons
1
Bel